Frank Sauerbrey is an East German former ski jumper who competed from 1984 to 1986. He also won a bronze medal in the team large hill competition at the 1985 FIS Nordic World Ski Championships in Seefeld.

Sauerbrey's best individual finish was 10th in a large hill event at Innsbruck in 1985.

External links

German male ski jumpers
Living people
FIS Nordic World Ski Championships medalists in ski jumping
Year of birth missing (living people)